"Ladykillers" is a song by English rock band Lush. It was released through 4AD on 26 February 1996 as the second single from the band's third studio album, Lovelife (1996). Known for its feminist themes, the song became one of the band's bigger hits, peaking at No. 22 on the UK Singles Chart, No. 18 on the US Billboard Modern Rock Tracks chart, and No. 15 on the Canadian RPM Alternative 30 chart. The song appeared in the video game NCAA Football 06.

Background
"Ladykillers" was described as a Britpop track and "a punky shot of Blondie-esque new wave". Lacking the reverb-indebted sound of the band's previous material, the track opened with "attention-seizing circular melody and spunky vocals" from lead vocalist Miki Berenyi. AllMusic's Stephen Thomas Erlewine said that it was influenced by "the direct, jagged pop of Elastica", but the band were annoyed by what Berenyi called "stupid Elastica comparisons".

Berenyi confirmed that the second and third verses of the song were about Red Hot Chili Peppers lead singer Anthony Kiedis and Weezer bassist Matt Sharp, respectively. Berenyi condemned Kiedis' behavior that she witnessed during Lollapalooza, labeling him as manipulative and detailing an incident in which Kiedis asked her to accompany him to a strip club, as well as Kiedis' abuse of groupies that occurred during the tour.

Critical reception
Annie Zaleski of The A.V. Club regarded the song as one of the album's standouts, describing it as "a welcome antidote to Britpop’s masculine point of view". Zaleski further stated that the track is "a righteous feminist statement in which Lush reminds those with a Y chromosome that respecting women and treating them like smart, competent human beings is perhaps the best first step." Consequence of Sound critic Frank Mojica stated that Berenyi eviscerates "men with transparent agendas and dubious attitudes towards women everywhere with an infectiously sarcastic wit". He concluded: "It’s what would have been hyped as a girl power anthem had it been released a couple years later."

The track was featured on VH1's list of "Top 10 Britpop Tracks".

Music video
A music video for the song, directed by Mark Pellington, was released in 1996. It features the band performing the song, as well as footage of praying mantises decapitating one another.

Track listings
UK 7-inch single
A. "Ladykillers" – 3:14
B. "I Wanna Be Your Girlfriend" (The Rubinoos cover) – 3:19

UK CD1
 "Ladykillers"
 "Matador"
 "Ex"
 "Dear Me" (Miki's 8-track home demo)

UK CD2
 "Ladykillers"
 "Heavenly"
 "Carmen"
 "Plums and Oranges"

Personnel
Personnel are lifted from the UK CD1 liner notes.

Lush
 Lush – production
 Miki Berenyi – vocals, guitar
 Emma Anderson – guitar, vocals
 Phil King – bass guitar
 Chris Acland – drums

Technical personnel
 Pete Bartlett – production
 Paul Q. Kolderie – mixing
 Sean Slade – mixing
 Giles Hall – engineering
 Liam Molloy – engineering assistant
 v23 – art direction and design
 Ichiro Kono – photography

Charts

Release history

References

External links
 

1996 singles
1996 songs
4AD singles
British new wave songs
Lush (band) songs
Music videos directed by Mark Pellington
Reprise Records singles
Songs with feminist themes